The name Newton has been used for five tropical cyclones in the Eastern Pacific Ocean.

 Tropical Storm Newton (1980) – short-lived storm, had no impact on land
 Hurricane Newton (1986) – made landfall along both the western and eastern shores of the Gulf of California
 Tropical Storm Newton (1992) – never impacted any land
 Hurricane Newton (2016) – made landfall on the Baja California peninsula
 Tropical Storm Newton (2022) – formed near southwestern Mexico and then moved out to sea, caused minor effects on land

Pacific hurricane set index articles